In 2004, following the popular success and numerous awards and nominations for the cable television series Monk, Varèse Sarabande released an official soundtrack on compact disc.

Containing original music composed and conducted by Jeff Beal, the 36-track album contains tracks from various first-season episodes, a special extended arrangement of the original theme, and one composition written and recorded, but ultimately not contained in an episode.  The disc plays for 53:25.

Track listing 
Jeff Beal's official website contains a self-proclaimed "obsessively compulsively detailed list" identifying each track's episode and context.  This list is reproduced below, albeit with some spelling and typo corrections.

 "Monk Theme" (extended version — this is special to the CD) This version features some solo takes Grant played on the theme when we were recording the original (pilot) version, and extra elements from the "Monk" musical palette — vibes, pizzicato strings and some drums.  02:34
 "Miming Mr. Monk" (from "Mr. Monk Takes a Vacation"). This was for the end of the episode, where Tony does the whole "wrap up" in pantomime; a little "Monk" silent movie. The gag was a theme in the episode between Tony and his guest star Polly Draper.  01:34
 "They're Killing Dr. Gould" (from "Mr. Monk Goes to the Asylum") Monk and his fellow mental patients recreate the murder of Dr. Gould in the lounge of the asylum.  01:03
 "A Clean Apartment" (from Mr. Monk and the Earthquake) This was the last scene of the show, when Monk finally has a clean apartment again. This little jazz tune was first heard in the pilot episode, and was one of the tunes written for a main title theme (before the other one was chosen).  01:16
 "Finding The Pebble" (from "Mr. Monk and the Psychic") Monk bolts outside from a reading meeting with Sharona and Dolly, patting himself down. He notices the pebbles in the driveway, which later become a very important clue.  00:58
 "Rejection" (from "Mr. Monk Goes to the Carnival"). Monk, hoping for reinstatement, is rejected by the review panel.  00:40
 "Trudy's Theme" (from various episodes). The sound of Trudy, first heard in the pilot episode, when Adrian goes over the crime photos in his apartment.  02:18
 "I Think I Smell Gas" (from "Mr. Monk and the Candidate") This is the very first piece of music ever wrote for "Monk." As Monk walks around a crime scene, brilliantly noticing details others miss, he also worries he forgot to turn the gas off back at his apartment.  01:49
 "Keys In The Casket" (from "Mr. Monk and the Candidate") Monk drops his key ring into the casket at a funeral for the slain bodyguard. He fishes them out from the balcony with dental floss and a paperclip.  02:15
 "Lucky Guy" (from Mr. Monk and the Other Woman). This theme actually played twice in the show. Once for the opening scene of the murder in the office of the attorney, and also for the murder of Grayson in the garage of Monk's new flame and possible felon, Monica Waters.  01:30
 "Fat Suit Folly" (from "Mr. Monk Meets Dale the Whale"). This was the wrap-up music of the episode. Monk does the recap, while Disher rolls around in the fat suit, unable to get up!  01:43
 "Monk Visits The Garage" (from "Mr. Monk and the Candidate") Monk goes back to the garage, looking for clues, which triggers a poignant recollection of Trudy's fate.  02:46
 "Counting Meters" (from "Mr. Monk and the Candidate") Monk walks down a San Francisco street, counting parking meters, and is chased by mysterious car. Even in danger of his life, he still keeps count as best he can.  01:12
 "Monk Interrogates Gavin" (from "Mr. Monk and the Candidate") Monk questions Gavin about his whereabouts the past few weeks.  01:13
 "Remember Me?" (from "Mr. Monk and the Airplane"). Adrian gets up to visit with some of the passengers he suspects, and ends up getting locked inside the aircraft restroom! Claustrophobia and hilarity ensue.  03:05
 "There Was A Struggle" (from "Mr. Monk and the Other Woman") Monk "reads" the murder scene at the Attorney's office.  01:43
 "Monk Theme" (series version) This is the version most people will recognize from season one. The Emmy won for this was Monks first!  00:51
 "Have Fun" (from "Mr. Monk Goes to the Carnival") Monk and Sharona, trying to "blend in," engage in various carnival activities.  01:05
 "Pebbles And Clues" (from "Mr. Monk and the Other Woman")  01:05
 "Sharpening Pencils" (from "Mr. Monk and the Red-Headed Stranger") While trying to interrogate Willie Nelson, Adrian becomes obsessed with properly sharpening his pencils.  00:48
 "Zen Monk" (from "Mr. Monk and the Candidate") Monk "reads" the room from where the assassin shot the Mayor's bodyguard. This theme was used in many subsequent episodes. The musically inclined might notice the use of a whole tone scale, a deliberate musical homage to another Monk — Thelonius!  00:47
 "Monk's A Hero" (from "Mr. Monk and the Candidate") Adrian emerges triumphantly and exhausted from the sewer.  00:56
 "Love These Sneaks" (from "Mr. Monk and the Marathon Man") Monk proudly displays his new running shoes, a gift from the legendary marathon runner (and his idol) Tonday.  02:03
 "My Hero" (from "Mr. Monk and the Other Woman") Adrian is smitten by the beautiful (and somewhat "Trudy-like") Monica Waters.  00:56
 "On The Beach" (a Monk mystery track) This little variation of the Monk Theme was written for the opening of the "Vacation" episode, but never used.  00:53
 "The Final Chase" (from "Mr. Monk and the Candidate") Adrian and Sharona venture down into the sewers of San Francisco to catch the killer.  03:49
 "Start The Watch" (from "Mr. Monk and the Marathon Man") Monk and Sharona try to recreate the steps (and timetable) of Trevor McDowell.  01:00
 "Losing It?" (from "Mr. Monk Goes to the Asylum") Monk becomes unglued.  00:33
 "Monk Escapes" (from "Mr. Monk Goes to the Asylum") Adrian escapes the "quiet room", eventually ending with a rooftop. 02:32
 "Worried Monk" (from "Mr. Monk and the Billionaire Mugger")  01:09
 "Restaging The Murder" (from "Mr. Monk and the Candidate") Adrian recreates the assassination of the bodyguard. This music was also used as the end title of the pilot.  01:48
 "Running Away" (from "Mr. Monk and the Billionaire Mugger") Monk, Sharona and "Fraidy Cop" run away from Monk's former client (who has finally paid Monk for his services).  00:54
 "Finding, Looking" (from "Mr. Monk Takes A Vacation"). Adrian is sure the Maids are guilty, but he's running out of time. He and Sharona look for a clue.  01:07
 "Back Safe At Home" (from "Mr. Monk Goes to the Asylum"). Adrian says goodnight to Sharona on the phone — this time he's in the right apartment.  01:03
 "The Kiss" (from "Mr. Monk and the Other Woman") Monica kissed Adrian goodbye, and he doesn't even wipe it off for germs!  01:08
 "Monk Theme"' (pilot version)  01:19

Credits 
 Composer:  Jeff Beal
 Producer:  Jeff Beal
 Executive Producer:  Robert Townson
 Music Editors:  Helena Lea (pilot) and Jeff Wolpert (series, season one)
 Master:  Erick Labson
 "Monk Theme" performed by Grant Geissman (guitar) and Jeff Beal.
 Recorded and Mixed by Jeff Beal at Many Rooms Music, California.
 Special Thanks:  Dean Parisot, Rob Thompson, Jackie de Crinis, Todd Sharp, Judith Marlan, Fern Field, Nancy Mullins, Helena Lea, Robert Messinger, Andy Breckman, David Hoberman and Tony Shalhoub.
 Score published by USA Network, LLC/BMI.

External links 
 http://www.jeffbeal.com/works/films/monk.html
 https://web.archive.org/web/20060902041047/http://www.usanetwork.com/series/monk/theshow/music/music.html
 http://www.usanetwork.com/series/monk/theshow/soundtrack/soundtrack.html

Television soundtracks
Monk (TV series)
2004 soundtrack albums